Atasharan (also Romanized as Ātashārān) is a village in Jey Rural District, in the Central District of Isfahan County, Isfahan Province, Iran. At the 2006 census, its population was 1,500, and 380 families.

References 

Populated places in Isfahan County